Grabels is a commune in the Hérault département in the Occitanie region in southern France. It is located on the north west of Montpellier.

Population

See also
Communes of the Hérault department

References

Communes of Hérault